24 heures d'amant is a 1964 film by Claude Lelouch, starring Carlos da Silva and Luce Dijoux. Set during the 24 hours of Le Mans race, Lelouch used shots from the 1963 race for its racing sequence.

The film's title is a pun on 24 Heures du Mans.

External links 

1964 films
Films directed by Claude Lelouch
French auto racing films
24 Hours of Le Mans
1960s sports films
1960s French films